Řepníky is a municipality and village in Ústí nad Orlicí District in the Pardubice Region of the Czech Republic. It has about 400 inhabitants.

Administrative parts
Villages of Pěšice and Popovec are administrative parts of Řepníky.

References

External links

Villages in Ústí nad Orlicí District